Peeling skin syndrome (also known as "acral peeling skin syndrome", "continual peeling skin syndrome", "familial continual skin peeling", "idiopathic deciduous skin", and "keratolysis exfoliativa congenita") is an autosomal recessive disorder characterized by lifelong peeling of the stratum corneum, and may be associated with pruritus, short stature, and easily removed anagen hair.

"Acral" refers to the fact that the peeling of the skin is most noticeable on the hands and feet of this state. Peeling happens sometimes on the arms and legs, too. The peeling is typically apparent from birth, although it may start in childhood or later on in life as well. Skin peeling is caused by sun, humidity, moisture, and friction.

The acral form can be associated with TGM5.

Syndromes 
Peeling skin syndrome is also associated with 6 syndromes that are each caused by a different genetic defect. The various syndromes include peeling skin syndrome 1, 2, 3, 4, 5, and 6.

Peeling skin syndrome 1 
Peeling skin syndrome 1 is caused by a genetic defect in the corneodesmosin (CDSN) gene. This gene localizes to the human epidermis and other epithelia. The protein experiences a chain of cleavages during corneocyte maturation.  Its symptoms include short stature, abnormality of metabolism/homeostasis, scaling skin, pruritus, erythema, asthma, brittle hair, and abnormality of hair texture.

Peeling skin syndrome 2 
Peeling Skin Syndrome 2 is caused by a genetic defect in the TGM5 gene. Transglutaminase 5 is best for catalyzing the cross-linking of proteins and the conjugation of polyamines to proteins. It also adds to the development of the cornified cell envelope of keratinocytes. Its symptoms include excessive wrinkling of palmar skin, skin erosion, hyperpigmentation of the skin, ichthyosis, and allergy.

Peeling skin syndrome 3 
Peeling skin syndrome 3 is caused by a genetic defect in the carbohydrate sulfotransferase (CHST8) gene. This gene is characterized by a way of asymptomatic lifelong and non-stop dropping of the stratum corneum of the dermis. Its symptoms begin for the duration of the second half of the primary decade of existence and encompass generalized white scaling taking place over the upper and lower extremities.

Peeling skin syndrome 4 
Peeling skin syndrome 4 is caused by a genetic defect in the cystatin A (CSTA) gene. This gene is an intracellular thiol proteinase inhibitor. It has an essential role in desmosome-mediated cell-cellular adhesion inside the lower levels of the dermis. Its symptoms include well-circumcised peeling of skin on the extremities and neck, generalized dry skin with fine scaling and sparing of face, hyperkeratosis, and palmoplantar keratoderma

Peeling skin syndrome 5 
Peeling skin syndrome 5 is caused by a genetic defect in the serpin (serpin family member 8) gene. This gene is produced by platelets and can bind to and inhibit the function of furin, which is a serine protease involved in platelet functions. It is also characterized by superficial peeling of the dorsal and palmar pores and skin of the hands and feet; the pores and skin of the forearms and legs may also be involved.  Its symptoms include superficial peeling of small areas of the skin that involve the dorsal and palmar surfaces of the hands and feet, superficial scaling of forearms and legs, and acanthosis.

Peeling skin syndrome 6 
Peeling skin syndrome 6 is caused by a genetic defect in the filaggrin (filaggrin family member 2) gene. The function for this gene is vital for normal cellular-cell adhesion within the cornified cell layers. It is also critical for the integrity and mechanical strength of the stratum corneum of the epidermis. Its symptom include dryness of the skin, peeling of the skin. erythema at lesion sites, bullae, and hyper-pigmentation.

Symptoms and signs
 Abnormal blistering of the skin
 Abnormality of hair texture
 Dry skin
 Aminoaciduria
 Hyperhidrosis
 Ichthyosis

Treatment 
There is no remedy for peeling skin syndrome. Treatment focuses on avoiding skin damage and treating symptoms as they occur. Ointments are also used to minimize skin peeling and when the blister grows, sterile needles may be activated. The condition can be exacerbated by hot temperatures, humidity, and friction. Individuals should be informed to avoid exacerbating triggers such as trauma, humidity, heat, perspiration, and water.

Frequency

Only several dozen cases have been reported in the literature, making it rare, but because its symptoms are mild and similar to other disorders it could very well be under-diagnosed.

See also 
 Idiopathic calcified nodules of the scrotum
 Keratolysis exfoliativa
 List of cutaneous conditions
 Corneodesmosin
 TGM5
 Carbohydrate sulfotransferase
 Cystatin A
 Serpin
 Filaggrin

References 

 Cabral, Rita M.; Kurban, Mazen; Wajid, Muhammad; Shimomura, Yutaka; Petukhova, Lynn; Christiano, Angela M. (2012-04). "Whole-exome sequencing in a single proband reveals a mutation in the CHST8 gene in autosomal recessive peeling skin syndrome". Genomics. 99 (4): 202–208. doi:10.1016/j.ygeno.2012-01-005. ISSN 1089-8646. PMC 4362535. .

External links 

Genodermatoses
Genetic disorders with OMIM but no gene
Syndromes